The  Dicastery for Promoting Integral Human Development (Dicasterium ad integram humanam progressionem fovendam in Latin) is a dicastery of the Roman curia.

The Vatican announced the creation of the dicastery on 31 August 2016 and it became effective 1 January 2017. Cardinal Peter Turkson was named its first prefect. The Prefect is to be assisted by a Secretary and at least one Undersecretary.

On 21 December 2021, members of the dicastery's leadership submitted their resignations in anticipation of the end of their five year mandate in January. Pope Francis accepted them. On 23 December 2021, Pope Francis named Cardinal Michael Czerny and Sister Alessandra Smerilli Interim Prefect and Secretary, respectfully, of the dicastery, beginning 1 January 2022. On 23 April 2022, Francis named the two as the official Prefect and Secretary, giving them a five year mandate.

Description
This dicastery of the Roman Curia combined the work of four Pontifical Councils established following the Second Vatican Council: Justice and Peace, Pastoral Care of Migrants and Itinerant People, Pastoral Assistance to Health Care Workers, and Cor Unum. Pope Francis has given it responsibility for "issues regarding migrants, those in need, the sick, the excluded and marginalized, the imprisoned and the unemployed, as well as victims of armed conflict, natural disasters, and all forms of slavery and torture".

On 16 June 2017 the Pope named Bruno Marie Duffé, a French professor with long experience in human rights and relief work, the dicastery's Secretary. Fr. Nicola Riccardi and Msgr. Segundo Tejado Muñoz were named undersecretaries, on 8 July 2017.

Migrants and Refugees Section 

The Pope announced that "temporarily" he would personally direct the special Migrants and Refugees Section which is part of the Dicastery. He named the Canadian Jesuit Michael Czerny (later cardinal) and the Italian Scalabrinian Fabio Baggio to serve as undersecretaries for issues related to refugees and migrants.

Vatican COVID-19 Commission 

On 20 March 2020, Pope Francis asked the Dicastery for Promoting Integral Human Development (DPIHD) to create a Vatican COVID-19 Commission to express the Church's solicitude facing the COVID-19 pandemic, and propose responses to the potential socio-economic challenges deriving from it.

Mission and activities

From the Statutes of the Dicastery for Promoting Integral Human Development:

References

External links 

 Apostolic Letter Humanam progressionem from the Holy See official website
 Statutes of the Dicastery for Promoting Integral Human Development from the Holy See official website
 Official website
 Official Twitter Account  @VaticanIHD
 YouTube Channel Vatican IHD
Official Website of the Migrants & Refugees Section

2016 establishments in Vatican City
2017 in Vatican City
Dicasteries
Christian organizations established in 2016